Prometheus Books is a publishing company founded in August 1969 by the philosopher Paul Kurtz (who was also the founder of the Council for Secular Humanism, Center for Inquiry, and co-founder of the Committee for Skeptical Inquiry). The publisher's name was derived from Prometheus, the Titan from Greek mythology who stole fire from Zeus and gave it to man. This act is often used as a metaphor for bringing knowledge or enlightenment.

Prometheus Books publishes a range of books, focusing on topics such as science, freethought, secularism, humanism, and skepticism. It has published in the "atheism" category since its founding in 1969, and is considered the "grandfather" of atheist publishing in America.

Their headquarters was located in Amherst, New York, and they publish worldwide. Jonathan Kurtz is an executive editor of Prometheus, which is an imprint of Globe Pequot Press.

The publisher has roughly 1,700 books currently in print, and publishes approximately 95–100 books per year. Since its founding, Prometheus Books has published more than 2,500 books.

Imprints 
Prometheus Books obtained the bulk of the books and manuscripts of Humanities Press International in 1998. It has been building and expanding this into a scholarly imprint named Humanity Books. This imprint publishes academic works across a wide spectrum of the humanities and is now distributed by the academic division of Rowman & Littlefield.

In March 2005, Prometheus Books launched the science fiction and fantasy imprint Pyr. In October 2012 it launched the crime fiction imprint Seventh Street Books. In 2018, it sold both imprints.

Lawsuits 
Prometheus has been involved in two "major libel lawsuits." In 1992 Uri Geller sued Victor J. Stenger and Prometheus Books for libel over his book Physics and Psychics. The suit was dismissed and Geller was required to pay more than $20,000 in costs to the defendant. Geller also sued Prometheus for publishing The Truth About Uri Geller  by James Randi, a book that he claimed was defamatory.

Notable authors published 
Some notable authors and books published by Prometheus include:

Steve Allen

 Meeting of Minds : The Complete Scripts, With Illustrations, of the Amazingly Successful PBS-TV Series  
 Steve Allen on the Bible, Religion and Morality  
 Dumbth: The Lost Art of Thinking With 101 Ways to Reason Better & Improve Your Mind 

Molefi Asante

Isaac Asimov

 Election Day 2084: A Science Fiction Anthology on the Politics of the Future 
 The Roving Mind 
 The Tyrannosaurus Prescription: And 100 Other Essays 
 Past, Present and Future

Jeremy Bentham

Rob Boston

 Why the Religious Right Is Wrong About Separation of Church and State 
 Taking Liberties: Why Religious Freedom Doesn't Give You the Right to Tell Other People What to Do 

Ludwig Feuerbach

Antony Flew

R. Barri Flowers
 Masters of True Crime

Martin Gardner
 The New Age: Notes of a Fringe Watcher

Guy P. Harrison

 50 Simple Questions for Every Christian

William R. Harwood

 Mythology's Last Gods: Yahweh and Jesus

Sidney Hook

 Sidney Hook on Pragmatism, Democracy, and Freedom: The Essential Essays 
 Sidney Hook: Philosopher of Democracy and Humanism 

Julian Huxley

S. T. Joshi

Dr. Jack Kevorkian
  Prescription: Medicide, the Goodness of Planned Death

John Maynard Keynes

Philip J. Klass

Leon Lederman

John W. Loftus

 The Outsider Test for Faith: How to Know Which Religion Is True 

Joe Nickell

 The Science of Ghosts: Searching for Spirits of the Dead
 The Science of Miracles: Investigating the Incredible

Friedrich Nietzsche

Mario Perniola

Robert M. Price

 Deconstructing Jesus 
 The Da Vinci Fraud: Why the Truth Is Stranger Than Fiction 
 The Empty Tomb: Jesus Beyond The Grave 

James Randi

David Ricardo

Michael Ruse

Nathan Salmon

George H. Smith

 Atheism: The Case Against God

John Steinbeck IV

Victor Stenger

 God and the Atom 

Tom Toles

Ibn Warraq

 Why I Am Not a Muslim 
 Virgins? What Virgins?: And Other Essays
 Defending the West: A Critique of Edward Said's Orientalism

Robert Zubrin

Partnerships and sale 
In 2013 Prometheus Books partnered with Random House in an effort to increase sales and distribution.

In 2019, it was acquired by Rowman & Littlefield, and Random House ceased sales and distribution of its titles as of June 30, 2019. Its building was sold in early 2019 for over $1 Million.

References

External links

 
Book publishing companies based in New York (state)
Companies based in Erie County, New York
Skepticism
Publishing companies established in 1969
Culture of Buffalo, New York